Atari Interactive is a name used by several separate groups and corporations since the mid-1990s. In 1996, it was the name of Atari Corporation's PC publishing division, bringing games like the Atari Jaguar's Tempest 2000 to the PC platform. From 1998 to 2001, Atari Interactive, Inc. was the name of the corporate entity that held the Atari properties purchased from JT Storage by Hasbro Interactive in 1998, and functioned as the retro publishing subsidiary of Hasbro Interactive. It is currently the name of a wholly owned subsidiary of Atari SA, who is the current owner of the Atari brand and various other properties formerly belonging to Hasbro Interactive. The current Atari Interactive was formed in 2001, when Infogrames Entertainment acquired Hasbro Interactive and proceeded to rename it to Infogrames Interactive. In 2003, IESA then changed the company name entirely to Atari Interactive, Inc. as part of its worldwide reorganization to focus on use of the Atari brand.

Division of Atari Corporation
On January 2, 1996, at the Winter Consumer Electronics Show, Atari Corporation formally announced the formation of Atari Interactive to "address the worldwide PC market". Planning to initially launch with four titles, Tempest 2000, Highlander: The Last of the MacLeods, Baldies, and FlipOut!, further releases were to include Missile Command 3D, Return to Crystal Castles, Rocky Interactive Horror Show, and Virtual War. By February 12, however, Atari Corporation was announcing a planned merger with drive manufacturer JTS, Inc, who had no interest to compete in any way in the video game or PC markets. Atari Corporation suspended its businesses, laid off about 80 percent of its staff and reportedly began liquidating its assets – which included the closing of the newly formed Atari Interactive division. The Atari/JTS merger officially took effect on July 30, 1996.

Hasbro Interactive subsidiary
On February 23, 1998, JTS sold all assets and properties of its Atari division to HIAC XI, Corp., a wholly owned subsidiary of Hasbro's Hasbro Interactive created in Delaware for the purpose of the purchase. Hasbro then renamed HIAC XI to Atari Interactive in May 1998 and would use the Atari brand name to publish retro-themed remake titles. On the 21st of that month, Hasbro announced that a remake of Centipede would be released for the PC and PlayStation. Throughout 1999 and 2000, games like The Next Tetris, Missile Command, Pong: The Next Level, Q*Bert, Glover, Nerf Arena Blast and Breakout would be released under the Atari branding.

Infogrames subsidiary

In 2001, Hasbro sold Hasbro Interactive and its subsidiaries to French publisher Infogrames Entertainment, SA (IESA). IESA then renamed it to Infogrames Interactive, Inc. On May 7, 2003, IESA officially reorganized its subsidiaries into Atari-branded names, which included renaming Infogrames Interactive, Inc. to Atari Interactive, Inc.

In 2003, Infogrames' US subsidiary Infogrames, Inc. licensed the Atari name and logo from Atari Interactive and changed its name to Atari using it to develop, publish and distribute games for all major video game consoles and personal computers under the Atari brand.

On January 21, 2013, Atari, Inc. and Atari Interactive, Inc. (collectively, the "Companies") filed petitions for relief under Chapter 11 in the United States Bankruptcy Court for the Southern District of New York. All three Ataris emerged from bankruptcy one year later and the entering of the social casino gaming industry with Atari Casino. Frederic Chesnais, who now heads all three companies, stated their entire operations consist of a staff of 10 people.

See also
 History of video games

References

External links

 Official website

Atari
2003 establishments in New York City
American companies established in 1996
American companies disestablished in 1996
American companies established in 1998
American companies disestablished in 2001
American companies disestablished in 2003
Video game companies established in 1996
Video game companies disestablished in 1996
Video game companies established in 1998
Video game companies disestablished in 2001
Video game companies disestablished in 2003
Video game development companies
Video game publishers
Video game companies of the United States
Companies based in New York City
Defunct companies based in New York (state)